Street Songs is the fifth studio album by American musician Rick James, released in April 1981 on Gordy Records. "Give It to Me Baby", the lead single from the album, became James' second number one single on the R&B chart, spending five weeks at the top spot.  The fifth song on the album, "Super Freak", was also one of James' biggest hits. A Deluxe Edition was released in 2001 containing an additional 17 mixes and live versions of the album tracks. Although the song "Fire and Desire" (a duet he performed with singer Teena Marie) was not originally released as a single, the song itself received much airplay on R&B radio stations and has since become a classic hit (James and Marie would reunite to perform the song at the 2004 BET Awards 5 weeks before James' death).

Reception

The album became an immediate success upon its release, eventually reaching number three on the US Pop chart—James's highest-charting album during his career—and spending twenty weeks at number one on the US R&B chart. The album was certified platinum in the US in July 1981. By 1983, the album had sold nearly 4 million copies worldwide. At the 1982 Grammys, James was nominated for Best Male Rhythm and Blues Vocal Performance for the album while being the first African American male artist to be nominated in the Best Male Rock Vocal Performance category for the song "Super Freak".

Track listing
All tracks composed and arranged by Rick James, except where noted.

Side A
 "Give It to Me Baby" – 4:07
 "Ghetto Life" – 4:20
 "Make Love to Me" – 4:48
 "Mr. Policeman" – 4:17

Side B
 "Super Freak" (James, Alonzo Miller) – 3:24
 "Fire and Desire" (Duet with Teena Marie) – 7:17
 "Call Me Up" – 3:53
 "Below the Funk (Pass the J)" – 2:36

2001 Deluxe edition
Disc one
 "Give It to Me Baby" (12" version) – 5:42
 "Give It to Me Baby" (instrumental) – 6:48
 "Super Freak" (12" version) – 7:05
 "Super Freak" (instrumental) – 3:33

Disc two (Recorded Live at Long Beach, California, July 30, 1981)
 "Introduction" – 1:46
 "Ghetto Life" – 4:21
 "Big Time" – 7:08
 "Come Into My Life" – 4:14
 "I'm a Sucker for Love" – 8:28
 "Square Biz" – 7:01
 "Fire It Up" – 3:35
 "Love Gun" – 5:42
 "Do You Want Some Funk (Interlude)" – 2:22
 "Mary Jane" – 10:39
 "Super Freak" – 4:21
 "You and I" – 11:48
 "Give It to Me Baby" – 6:05

2002 remastered edition
 "Give It to Me Baby" (12" version) – 5:42
 "Super Freak" (12" version) – 7:05

Personnel 
Performers
Rick James – lead vocals
Ja'net Dubois – background vocals
Melvin Franklin – background vocals ("Give It to Me Baby")
Lawrence Hilton-Jacobs – background vocals
Teena Marie – lead vocals ("Fire and Desire"), background vocals ("Give It to Me Baby", "Mr. Policeman")
Mary Jane Girls – background vocals
The Temptations (Dennis Edwards, Melvin Franklin, Glenn Leonard, Richard Street, Otis Williams) – background vocals ("Ghetto Life", "Super Freak")

Musicians
Gerald Albright – flute ("Make Love to Me", "Fire and Desire")
Oscar Alston – bass, handclaps, percussion
Reggie Andrews – string arranger
Rollice Dale – string contractor
Clifford J. Ervin – flugelhorn, piccolo, trumpet
John Ervin – flute, trombone
Fernando Harkless, Roy Poper – trumpet
Nathan Hughes, Armando Perzara, Raul Rekow, Bugsy Wilcox – percussion
Rick James – arranger, bass, composer, drums, guitar, horns, percussion, producer, timbales, timpani
Daniel LeMelle – flute, handclaps, horn arrangements, alto and tenor saxophone, string arrangements
Tom McDermott – guitar, percussion
Alonzo Miller – producer, composer
Narada Michael Walden – drums
Stevie Wonder – harmonica soloist ("Mr. Policeman")
Levi Ruffin – synthesizers

Charts

Weekly charts

Year-end charts

Singles

Certifications

References

External links
 Rick James-Street Songs at Discogs

1981 albums
Rick James albums
Albums produced by Rick James
Gordy Records albums
Concept albums